Kahana Bay and Kahana Bay Beach Park are located on the windward side of the island of Oahu in the state of Hawaii.

Description

Kahana Bay and beach park is located along  Kamehameha Highway on Oahu adjacent to Ahupua'a O Kahana State Park between Kaʻaʻawa and Punaluʻu. The beach is known for fishing, wading and serenity and although it is a beach park, it has limited facilities due to its remote location.

History
The area  around Kahana, especially mauka (up hill), was historically a native Hawaiian fishing and farming community prior to Western contact. Due to the abundant fresh water and fertile soil in the valley, the area was able to sustain a small population. Kahana Bay was said to provide a sustainable supply of fish and shellfish.

References

Beaches of Oahu
Protected areas of Oahu
Bays of Oahu
Parks in Hawaii